Patrik Banovič (born 13 November 1991) is a Slovak footballer who plays as a centre back for OFK Malženice.

He is grandson of a famous former defender Kamil Majerník, who also played for Spartak Trnava.

Club career
Banovič  made his league debut for Trnava against Nitra on 24 March 2010.

In January 2019, Banovič moved back to OFK Malženice. He left the club in the winter 2020 to join Swiss club FC Kosova on a 1,5-year deal. However, due to the COVID-19 pandemic, he made no official appearances for the club. He then returned to Malženice in the summer 2020.

References

1991 births
Living people
Slovak footballers
Slovak expatriate footballers
Association football defenders
FC Spartak Trnava players
FC DAC 1904 Dunajská Streda players
FK Dukla Banská Bystrica players
Spartak Myjava players
FC ViOn Zlaté Moravce players
Slovak Super Liga players
Slovak expatriate sportspeople in Switzerland
Expatriate footballers in Switzerland
Sportspeople from Trnava